Lekos (Lek, Lekas, Lekan) - the legendary ancestor-eponym of "Lek" tribe of the North Caucasus. In Georgian sources, the fifth son (or offspring) of Togarmah.

Ancient History
According to Leonti Mroveli: "Gave to Lekan territories from the Sea of Daruband to the river Lomek, to the north up to the great river of Khazareti". In all likelihood, Lekos was the first king on the territory of Dagestan.

Historical background
In the Georgian sources ethnonym "Leki" is usually used to refer to all the peoples of Daghestan. 

There can be several historical backgrounds given. Geographically Georgians are close to the Tsakhurs and Avars, who are "Leki" for Georgians in the first place. 

History of Dagestan is closely connected with Kazi-Kumukh. Shamkhals of Lakia and the kings of Georgia had centuries-long history of relations that could be reflected in the name the Georgians give to Dagestanis.

In the history of Georgia 18th century is called "Leki-anoba" (i.e. the invasion of Daghestanis) that had direct relevance to military interventions of Daghestanis into Georgia, and more of the Avar ruler.

Etymology
Georgian "Leki " is naturally associated with the Laks, as indicated by P. K. Uslar and others.

References

See also
 Laks
 Dargins
 Avars
 Lezgins
 Kumyks
 Dagestan
 Northeastern Caucasian languages

Japheth